The German education system or continental education system is a higher education model, often contrasted with the Anglo-Saxon education system and the Scandinavian education system. It was the standard tertiary education model for most of the countries of Continental Europe before the implementation of the Anglo-Saxon model there due to the Bologna Process.

A distinction exists between vocational education (Fachhochschule; i.e.: school of applied sciences) and academic higher education (at university).

In contrast to the Anglo-Saxon model with common lower and higher academic degree for all subjects (Bachelor degree and Master's degree, respectively), in the German model the degrees are Diplom for the more practical subjects such as i.e. engineering, but also economics and business and (in Germany and Austria) the Magister Artium for the more theoretical subjects, such as social sciences or humanities.

See also
 Higher education policy
 Education in Germany

References 

Education in Germany